Atte Mustonen (born 16 September 1988 in Heinola, Finland), is a single-seater motor racing driver.

Motorsport career

Like many aspiring motor racing drivers, Mustonen began his career with kart racing at the age of 11. By 2002, his talent became evident when he won the ICA Junior Karting Championship in Finland, and successfully retained his title in 2003. The two back-to-back victories helped him to be named Finnish Karting Driver of the Year in 2003.

The following year, 2004, was pivotal in Mustonen's career, with him winning the Finnish Formula A Championship and being named Finnish Karting Driver of the Year once again. He also competed in the Winter, Constructor and Pomposa International Cups, where he registered on the international radar for the sport.

In 2005, Mustonen transferred to the Italian FR 2.0 Winter Trophy, which he won. The following year, he competed in the European version, where he registered a few podiums in another successful season.

Mustonen was signed by Räikkönen Robertson Racing for the 2007 British Formula 3 Championship, as a teammate in the Championship class to Jonathan Kennard and Stephen Jelley. He impressed with his fast but often erratic races, not uncommon for a young racing driver. He broke the lap record at Snetterton, and achieved his first victory of the season in race two at the Thruxton round of the championship. He ended the year ranked 7th in the overall standings.

He returned for a second season in 2008, but had a largely uneventful season. A win at Rockingham was the only major highlight, as he ended up sixth in the championship, losing out on fifth to Marcus Ericsson in the final round.

Mustonen moved to the Formula Three Euroseries for the 2009 season, driving for the Motopark Academy team alongside Christopher Zanella. Mustonen missed the rounds at Oschersleben due to health problems, and was replaced by Renger van der Zande. Mustonen returned for the rounds at the Nürburgring and Brands Hatch, before van der Zande returned to replace him from Barcelona onwards.

Racing record

Career summary

References

External links
Atte Mustonen Official Website
Atte Mustonen at Lukoil Racing Team Website

1988 births
Living people
People from Heinola
Finnish racing drivers
German Formula Renault 2.0 drivers
Italian Formula Renault 2.0 drivers
Formula Renault Eurocup drivers
Formula Renault 2.0 NEC drivers
British Formula Three Championship drivers
Formula 3 Euro Series drivers
Sportspeople from Päijät-Häme
Koiranen GP drivers
Jenzer Motorsport drivers
Double R Racing drivers
Motopark Academy drivers
Signature Team drivers